Darby Leigh Stanchfield (born April 29, 1971) is an American actress. She is best known for her role as Abby Whelan in the ABC political drama series Scandal (2012–2018). Stanchfield is also known for roles as April Green in the CBS post-apocalyptic drama series Jericho (2006–07), and as Helen Bishop in the AMC period drama series Mad Men (2007–08). In 2020, she began starring as Nina Locke in the Netflix fantasy horror series Locke & Key.

Early life
Stanchfield was born and raised in Kodiak, Alaska, where her father was a commercial fisherman. She later moved to Dutch Harbor in the Aleutian Islands, and finally Mercer Island, near Seattle. She attended the University of Puget Sound, graduating in 1993 with a degree in Communications and a minor in theater. She graduated from the American Conservatory Theater in San Francisco.

Career

2000—2011
Stanchfield began her career in theater, and made her television debut in an episode of CBS crime drama, Diagnosis: Murder in 2000. She later appeared in a number of television shows, including dramas Angel, Monk, American Dreams, Strong Medicine, Without a Trace, Nip/Tuck, Bones, Cold Case, and The Mentalist, and well as sitcoms That '80s Show, It's All Relative and How I Met Your Mother. In feature films, she had the female lead role opposite Josh Duhamel in the 2004 adaptation of Oscar Wilde's The Picture of Dorian Gray, and co-starred as Nathan Fillion's character wife in the comedy-drama Waitress (2007). She later has appeared in a number of independent films.

From 2006 to 2007, Stanchfield was a regular cast member in the CBS post-apocalyptic drama series Jericho as April Green. In 2007 she played Amelia Joffe (replacing Annie Wersching for two weeks in May) in the ABC daytime soap opera, General Hospital. She later was cast in the recurring role as Helen Bishop on Mad Men, appearing on five episodes. She also played Shannon Gibbs, Mark Harmon's character's first wife, in the CBS procedural NCIS appearing in seven episodes from 2006 to 2015. Stanchfield also guest starred as Meredith, the title character's first ex-wife, on the ABC comedy-drama series Castle in 2009 and in 2013.

2012—present
In March 2011, Shonda Rhimes cast Stanchfield in her political drama series Scandal. Before Scandal, Stanchfield had guest role on Shonda Rhimes' Private Practice in 2008. The series debuted on ABC on April 5, 2012. She plays the role of Abby Whelan, the investigator in the lead character firm, and later the White House Press Secretary. The series ran for seven seasons and 124 episodes ending in 2018. In 2017, she directed all six episodes of Gladiator Wanted, a web series that debuted prior to the sixth-season premiere and features Guillermo Diaz as Huck, Katie Lowes as Quinn, Cornelius Smith Jr. as Marcus and George Newbern as Charlie. In 2018, she directed one episode of the final season titled "The Noise".

During her Scandal years, Stanchfield co-starred in a number of films. She appeared in the crime horror thriller Carnage Park (2016), that premiered at Sundance Film Festival, and co-starred opposite Raza Jaffrey and Stana Katic in The Rendezvous (2017). She starred alongside Emily Bett Rickards and Meaghan Rath in the mystery-horror The Clinic. In 2018, she was cast as a lead character's mother in the drama Justine. She also played lead character's mother in the 2020 romance drama film Stargirl directed by Julia Hart.

On January 30, 2019, it was announced that Stanchfield had been cast in the series regular role of Nina Locke on the Netflix supernatural drama series Locke & Key. The first season premiered on February 7, 2020 to positive reviews from critics.

Filmography

Film

Television

Web

References

External links

1971 births
American film actresses
American television actresses
American stage actresses
Living people
People from Kodiak, Alaska
Actresses from Alaska
University of Puget Sound alumni
Actresses from Washington (state)
People from Mercer Island, Washington
20th-century American actresses
21st-century American actresses